

This is a list of the National Register of Historic Places listings in Alfalfa County, Oklahoma.

This is intended to be a complete list of the properties on the National Register of Historic Places in Alfalfa County, Oklahoma, United States. The locations of National Register properties for which the latitude and longitude coordinates are included below, may be seen in a map.

There are 12 properties listed on the National Register in the county.

Current listings

|}

See also

 List of National Historic Landmarks in Oklahoma
 National Register of Historic Places listings in Oklahoma

References

 
Alfalfa County
Buildings and structures in Alfalfa County, Oklahoma